Public Culture is a peer-reviewed, interdisciplinary academic journal of cultural studies, published three times a year—in January, May, and September—by Duke University Press. It is sponsored by the Department of Media, Culture, and Communication at New York University.

A four-time CELJ award winner, Public Culture has been publishing field-defining ethnographies and analyses of the cultural politics of globalization for more than twenty-five years. The journal provides a forum for the discussion of the places and occasions where cultural, social, and political differences emerge as public phenomena, manifested in everything from highly particular and localized events in popular or folk culture to global advertising, consumption, and information networks. Artists, activists, and both well-established and younger scholars, from across the humanities and social sciences and around the world, present some of their most innovative and exciting work in the pages of Public Culture.

The journal was established in 1988 by anthropologists Carol Breckenridge and Arjun Appadurai. Professor of Sociology and Director of the Institute for Public Knowledge at New York University Eric Klinenberg served as Public Culture's editor-in-chief from 2010 to 2015, during which time he initiated the online book review offshoot Public Books. From 2015 to 2019, Public Culture was edited by Shamus Khan, Professor of Sociology at Columbia University. Since 2020, the journal is edited by Arjun Appadurai and Erica Robles-Anderson, Professors of Media, Culture, and Communication at New York University.

Public Culture received awards for Best New Journal in 1992 and Best Special Issue in 2000 from The Council of Editors of Learned Journals. In 2013, the same body named Public Culture co-winner of the Phoenix Award for Significant Editorial Achievement, recognizing the journal's revitalization and transformation with a "marked emphasis on accessibility and broader relevance." The journal has also been reviewed in the Times Literary Supplement.

Public Books 
Founded in 2012 by editors-in-chief Sharon Marcus and Caitlin Zaloom, Public Books supports an international community of emerging and established intellectuals and artists committed to vigorous debate about works and ideas that deserve timely, intensive discussion. The online journal is independently edited but affiliated with Public Culture. Public Books welcomes proposals for review essays about books (fiction or nonfiction), films, exhibitions, or plays, as well as profiles of intellectuals or literary scenes, visual essays, and multimedia work.

References

External links 
 Journal page at Duke University Press, including submissions information
 Public Books
 The Institute for Public Knowledge at New York University

Triannual journals
English-language journals
Publications established in 1988
Duke University Press academic journals
Globalization-related journals
Cultural journals